Lucky Air is a low cost carrier based in Kunming, Yunnan, China. The airline started with flights connecting Kunming with Dali and Xishuangbanna, and later expanded to other domestic and international destinations. Its main base is Kunming Changshui International Airport. The airline is one of the four founding members of the U-FLY Alliance.

History 
The airline was established in July 2004 as a start-up airline known as Shilin Airlines. Hainan Airlines had invested 2.93 million yuan in the company, while its affiliate Shanxi Airlines invested 47.07 million yuan. The airlines provided the new company with three Dornier aircraft, a Boeing aircraft, and a Dash-8. The Yunnan Shilin Tourism Aviation Co. also invested a further 1 million yuan.

On 23 December 2005, Shilin Airlines was renamed Lucky Air. It started operations with a flight between Kunming and Dali within Yunnan on 26 February 2006.

The airline is owned by Hainan Airlines, Shanxi Airlines and Yunnan Shilin Tourism Aviation. It has 263 employees (at March 2007).

The airline is one of the four founding members of the U-FLY Alliance, which is the world's first alliance of low-cost carriers. It formed in January 2016 by HK Express, Lucky Air, Urumqi Air, and West Air.
Lucky intended to deploy 787-9s to Europe and North America by the end of 2016.

Destinations 

Lucky Air has expanded its network rapidly. By now, it covers 51 domestic cities, 11 foreign cities and 2 regional cities.

Fleet

, Lucky Air fleet includes the following aircraft:

References

External links

  

Airlines of China
Airlines established in 2004
Companies based in Kunming
Transport in Yunnan
Chinese brands
HNA Group
U-FLY Alliance
Chinese companies established in 2004
Low-cost carriers